Khash Rod District or Khashrowd (Persian/Pashto: خاشرود), Balochi: خواش‌رود)is a district of Nimruz Province in Afghanistan. It had a population of 35,381 in 2004, which was 55% ethnic Pashtun, 20% Baloch, 15% Brahui and 10% Tajik. The district capital is Khash.

See also
Districts of Afghanistan
 Khash River

References

Districts of Nimruz Province